Adriano Vieira Louzada (born 3 January 1979), known simply as Adriano, is a Brazilian footballer.

He spent most of his professional career in Portugal, amassing Primeira Liga totals of 145 matches and 62 goals over seven seasons in representation of Nacional, Porto and Braga and winning five major titles with the second club.

Club career
Adriano was born in Rio Branco, Acre. He started playing in 1998 for Portuguesa then went on to represent, in his country, Palmeiras.

Switching to Portugal in 2002, Adriano began playing with Madeira's C.D. Nacional. After a quick return stint in Brazil with Cruzeiro he joined FC Porto in January 2006, and gradually made his way into the starting eleven, helping the northern club conquer the Primeira Liga championship and also scoring the winning goal in that year's Portuguese Cup final.

After Lisandro López's conversion into the striker position, Adriano lost his starting job, but was often brought in from the bench. In August 2008 he was due for a transfer to fellow league side C.F. Os Belenenses; however, he refused, choosing to stay at Porto and fight for a place, but did not appear in a single competitive game throughout the 2008–09 season.

In late August 2009, with his chances to play for Porto virtually none, Adriano arranged for a release from his contract, and soon moved to S.C. Braga. He appeared rarely for the second-placed team, being released in June 2010 and returning to his country, where he all but competed in the lower leagues and amateur football (with the exception of one year back in Europe with U.D. Oliveirense).

Honours
Palmeiras
Torneio Rio-São Paulo: 2000
Copa dos Campeões: 2000

Porto
Primeira Liga: 2005–06, 2006–07, 2007–08
Taça de Portugal: 2005–06
Supertaça Cândido de Oliveira: 2006

References

External links

1979 births
Living people
People from Rio Branco, Acre
Brazilian footballers
Association football forwards
Campeonato Brasileiro Série A players
Campeonato Brasileiro Série B players
Campeonato Brasileiro Série C players
Campeonato Brasileiro Série D players
Associação Portuguesa de Desportos players
Sociedade Esportiva Palmeiras players
Esporte Clube Vitória players
Cruzeiro Esporte Clube players
Sport Club do Recife players
Esporte Clube Santo André players
Grêmio Barueri Futebol players
Primeira Liga players
Liga Portugal 2 players
C.D. Nacional players
FC Porto players
S.C. Braga players
U.D. Oliveirense players
Brazilian expatriate footballers
Expatriate footballers in Portugal
Brazilian expatriate sportspeople in Portugal
Sportspeople from Acre (state)